Magnesia (Magnisía, Ancient Greek: Magnēsía, deriving from the tribe name Magnetes) is one of the regional units of Greece. It is part of the region of Thessaly. Its capital is the city of Volos. About 70% of the population of Magnesia live in the Greater Volos area, which is the second-largest city in Thessaly and the third busiest commercial port in Greece.

According to the most recent census (2011), the population stands at 190,010. The regional unit hosts 2,000,000 tourists annually. Magnesia is represented in the Greek Parliament by six seats. Its main agricultural products are wheat, cotton, tomatoes, grapes, olives, apples and honey.

Geography

A prominent geographic feature of Magnesia is the Pagasetic Gulf, a bay of the Aegean Sea. The Pelion mountain range closes off the Gulf on the east and south side, leaving only a narrow channel near Trikeri. The highest peak of the wooded Pelion is Pourianos Stavros or Xeforti, (altitude ). On the south edge of Magnesia peninsula Tisaio mountain is found.

Mt. Maurovouni is the northeasternmost mountain of the regional unit and extends to the neighboring regional unit of Larissa. The southwest border of Magnesia is formed by the Othrys, with its highest peak Gerakovouni. The interior of Magnesia has two plains. The plains southwest of the Pagasetic Gulf are called the Almyros plains, while the plains northwest of the Gulf are called the Volos-Velestino plain. The hydrological network of Magnesia is not particularly rich and is characterized by the absence of big rivers. The waters coming from Pelion shape the rivers Anavros, Platanorema, and Xirias.

In the North section of Magnesia, Lake Karla was formerly found. Lake Karla was drained in 1962, but attempts have been made for its partial restoration. On the bight of Sourpi, next to Amaliapolis a coastal wetland is located, with various species of migratory birds. This wetland together with the forest of Kouri – an infrequent lowland of oak forest close to Almyros – is included in the list of the protected regions of the European Network Natura 2000.

Climate

The average temperature is 17 degrees Celsius and the average rainfall about 540 millimetres per year. Heat waves and intense cold periods are rare. The climate varies in different parts of the prefecture; close to the Pagasetic Gulf conditions are humid, in Nea Ionia it is quite dry and in Velestino and Almyros is the climate is continental. In winter there is significant snowfall in the mountains and often freezing temperatures.

Administration

The regional unit Magnesia is subdivided into 5 municipalities. These are (number as in the map in the infobox):
Almyros (2)
Rigas Feraios (6)
South Pelion (Notio Pilio, 5)
Volos (1)
Zagora-Mouresi (4)

Prefecture

Magnesia was created as a prefecture. In addition to the territory of the present regional unit of Magnesia, the Magnesia Prefecture included the Northern Sporades group of islands (Skiathos, Skopelos and Alonnisos). As a part of the 2011 Kallikratis government reform, the prefecture was split into the Magnesia and Sporades regional units. At the same time, the municipalities were reorganised, according to the table below.

Provinces
Province of Volos – Volos
Province of Almyros – Almyros
Province of Skopelos and Sporades – Skopelos
Note: Provinces no longer hold any legal status in Greece.

History

Antiquity

Founding

According to Hesiod's (probably) "Eoiae" or "Catalogue of Women" on the origin of the Greeks, Pandora (named after her grandmother Pandora, sister of Hellen and daughter of Deukalion and Pyrrha) together with Zeus had one son Graecus, while Zeus had two more with Thyia, another of Deukalion's daughter: Magnes and Macedon. Magnes and Makednos  together with Hellen's three sons Dorus, Xuthus (with his sons Ion and Achaeus) and Aeolus, comprised the set of progenitors of the ancient tribes that formed the Greek/Hellenic nation. Magnes ruled the area and people under his name. Magnesia is also homeland of the mythical heroes Jason, Peleus and his son Achilles.

The Magnetes contributed to the Greek colonization, with their main colonies being established before the 7th century BC, under the names of Magnesia beside Sipylus in Lydia and Magnesia on the Maeander in Ionia.

Nomenclature

The word magnet comes from the Greek "magnítis líthos" (μαγνήτης λίθος), which means stone of Magnesia. The names for the elements magnesium and manganese are also derived from either this region or its colony Magnesia ad Sipylum, which in addition to the magnetic magnetite (an iron ore), produces certain ores of magnesium and manganese that were known to alchemists.

Common era
Written accounts and remains from the 5th century CE document the appearance of Christianity in Magnesia. The minutes of the 3rd Ecumenical Conference are co-signed by the Bishop of Dimitriada Cleonikos. Five basilicas have been revealed in Nea Anhialos, showing that the area was undergoing a spiritual growth in that era. Magnesias has churches, monasteries and chapels, many of which are architectural masterpieces in the style that is called "Pelioritica".

In the area of Pelion are the monasteries of Saint Gerasimos in Makrinitsa, The Holy Archangels in Agios Georgios Nilias, Osios Lavredios in Agios Lavrendis, Saint John the Baptist in Siki and Saint Spiridon in Promiri. The most famous is the Flamouriou Monastery, built in the 16th century by Osios Simeon, the so-called "barefoot and loin-clothed", located near Veneto.

In the Almyros area and on the mountain of Othris two other monasteries were built, one inhabited by monks in Ano Panagia (Virgin Mary) Xenia and the other by nuns in Kato Panagia Xenia. This monastery holds historical monuments of the area from the 12th century, with of frescoes, treasuries and a library. In Kato Panagia Xenia monastery, an icon of the Virgin Mary,  venerated by the people of the area, is kept. All the monasteries are of archeological, historical and artistic interest and are accessible (Flamouriou Monastery only by men).

Archaeological sites

Demetrias
Iolcus
Mikrothives
Nea Anchialos
Pagasae

Media
TRT TV
ASTRA TELEVISION

Transport

The prefecture was linked to the National railway (ΟΣΕ) in the late 19th century. In 1964, the GR-1 North-South superhighway was opened to traffic. The prefecture is directly linked to the rest of Europe through International Airport of Central Greece, located in Nea Anchialos,  a short distance from Volos. The airport includes a terminal which can serve 1,500 passengers per hour.

The prefecture's roads include:
Greek National Road 1/E75, SW, W, NW
Greek National Road 6, Cen., NW
Greek National Road 30, W, Cen.

Notable residents
Saint Charalampe, (89–202) Eastern Orthodox Church Saint
Giorgio de Chirico, (1888–1978)
Lavrentis Dianellos, a Greek actor
Rigas Feraios, the first Greek revolutionary and poet, national hero
Anthimos Gazis, (died 1828)
Phaidon Gizikis (June 13, 1917 – July 17, 1999 in Athens), Greek politician
Theophilos Hatzimihail, artist, (1871–1934)
Lavrentis Machairitsas, composer, musician
Alexandros Papadiamantis, (1851–1911)
Vangelis Papathanassiou, composer, born 1943
Paraskevi Tsiamita, Gold Medalist in triple jump, 1999 World Championships in Athletics
Olga Vasdeki, Bronze Medalist in triple jump, 1999 World Championships in Athletics
Sofia Vembo, (1910–1978), musician, artist

See also
List of traditional Greek place names
List of settlements in the Magnesia regional unit

References

External links
Nea Anchialos Municipality
History of Magnesia

 
2011 establishments in Greece
Regional units of Thessaly